The pharmacist-to-pharmacy technician ratio is a legal regulation that establishes the maximum number of pharmacy technicians that may be supervised by a licensed pharmacist at one given time. For example, a pharmacist-to-pharmacy technician ratio of 1:3 would mean that three people are allowed to be working as pharmacy technicians at one time for every one pharmacist present.

Characterization
In the United States, the regulation of the pharmacist-to-pharmacy technician ratio is regulated at the individual state level. Some states vary the ratio by institutional (e.g. hospital) pharmacy practice versus retail (i.e. community) pharmacy practice, while others do not regulate pharmacist-to-pharmacy technician ratios at all. The ratios vary from a minimum of 1:2 (e.g. in Kansas) to 1:6 (e.g. Idaho).

In some countries, such as in the United Kingdom and in Denmark, technicians can practice without pharmacist supervision at all. Globally, one survey found that pharmacists are the most frequent source of supervision for pharmacy technicians.

Rationale and criticism
Pharmacist-to-pharmacy technician ratios are an attempt to find a balance between providing assistance to the practicing pharmacist in operating the pharmacy while maintaining adequate supervision of their pharmacy technicians. While staffing issues are reported by pharmacy technicians to increase the risk for medication-related medical errors, misconduct by an unsupervised pharmacy technician can result in significant patient harm. Critics of low pharmacist-to-pharmacy technician ratios have complained that the lack of pharmacy technicians staffing forces pharmacists to devote more time to non-clinical, dispensing-related tasks, as opposed to performing direct patient care services and over-the-counter counseling.

History
While pharmacist-to-pharmacy technician ratio were initially low with pharmacy technicians engaged in retail tasks (acting as cashiers), the ratios have increased over time as pharmacy technicians have taken on new duties, such as pharmaceutical formulation and intermediating between the pharmacy and insurance companies.

See also
Pharmacy (shop)

References

Pharmacies
Technicians